Fouhy is a surname. Notable people with this surname include:

 Ben Fouhy (born 1979), New Zealand canoeist
 Craig Fouhy, American American football player and coach
 David Fouhy, official Secretary to the Governor-General of New Zealand
 Ed Fouhy (1934–2015), American journalist and television news executive
 Matty Fouhy (1923–1977), Irish hurler
 Roger Fouhy (born 1972), New Zealand cricket player